Statistics for the Intercontinental Cup which ran from 1960 to 2004.

Finals

By country

By team

By continent

After the events of the 1969 Intercontinental Cup, many European Cup champions refused to play in the Intercontinental Cup. On five occasions, they were replaced by the tournament's runners-up. Two Intercontinental Cups were called off after the runners-up also declined to participate.

Man of the Match
Since 1980

See also
Intercontinental Cup
FIFA Club World Cup, the Intercontinental Cup's succeeding competition
Copa Libertadores
UEFA Champions League

Notes

References

Statistics
International club association football competition records and statistics